The Wilmslow Road bus corridor is a 5.5-mile-long section of road in Manchester that is served by a large number of bus services. The corridor runs from Parrs Wood to Manchester city centre along Wilmslow and Oxford Roads, serving Didsbury, Withington, Fallowfield and Rusholme.

Several frequent routes combine to operate along the northern section, providing access to the University of Manchester, Manchester Metropolitan University (MMU), the Royal Northern College of Music (RNCM), Manchester Royal Infirmary (MRI) and Christie Hospital. Many services along the route are provided by older vehicles, such as the Magic Bus brand operated by Stagecoach Manchester.

Busiest bus corridor in Europe?
Wilmslow Road is often claimed to be the busiest bus corridor in Europe. However, this is difficult to verify because:

No authoritative comparison is available.
The bus frequency on Wilmslow Road varies at different points. This will be true of other corridors and hence the busiest corridor is likely to depend on how short a road can be considered.
Bus frequencies vary over the day so the busiest corridor may depend on whether the peak frequency or average frequency is taken.
No qualifier is given as to what constitutes 'busy' - whether frequency of buses or total passengers carried and when.

The 3.7 mile stretch of route between Piccadilly Gardens and Withington has a timetabled average of at least one bus per minute in each direction on Monday to Friday daytimes during university term. However, particularly during rush hour, there are many buses which do not appear on the timetable and rather repeat the journey as frequently as possible.

Two competing bus companies are the major providers of services along the corridor: Stagecoach Manchester (including the Magic Bus brand) and First Greater Manchester. Both companies run frequent services the whole length of the route. The half mile stretch of route in the city centre between the RNCM and Oxford Road station has a timetabled average of nearly a bus every 30 seconds in each direction.

In 2006, the Parliamentary Select Committee on Transport was told:

History
Bus deregulation in 1986 allowed bus companies to run services wherever and whenever they wanted. Prior to this, most bus services along Wilmslow Road had been operated by publicly owned operator Greater Manchester Passenger Transport Executive.

In 1986, the bus operation was separated into a stand-alone company, GM Buses. Finglands Coachways started operating their own competitive bus services soon after, capitalising on the lack of capacity for students along the route. They were soon followed by other coach operators such as Wall's and Bullocks.

GM Buses fought back by reintroducing crew-operated buses to the route. Ten AEC Routemasters were acquired from London in 1988 and operated on route 143 to West Didsbury, branded as the "Piccadilly Line" after the London Underground line. They operated until June 1990, when they were replaced with standard vehicles. Larger operators also operated competing services along Wilmslow Road during the 1990s, including Bee Line and MTL Manchester.

The southern half of GM Buses was sold to Stagecoach in February 1996, who introduced the "no frills" Magic Bus services along the route in competition with their main routes. Intense competition from a new operator called UK North led to lower fares, with Finglands offering a £2 student weekly ticket in 2001. Competition has reduced in recent years: UK North ceased operations in 2006 after an investigation into their safety records by the North West Traffic Commissioner, whilst Bullocks sold their bus services to Stagecoach in 2008.

Stagecoach introduced 30 new hybrid double-deck buses on services 42 and 43 in September 2010. The vehicles were funded through the Department for Transport's Green Bus Fund. Bullocks Coaches had also been awarded similar funding for 4 vehicles that are likely to be used on their Oxford Road link route 147.

On 1 August 2013, First Greater Manchester announced that it had agreed to purchase Finglands. The deal was concluded on 9 February 2014. After initially using a combination of older buses from its own fleet and Finglands, it introduced a fleet of new Alexander Dennis Enviro400s and Wright StreetLites. On 27 April 2014, First Greater Manchester increased service levels and extended some route 42 journeys to North Manchester General Hospital under the Cross Connect banner.

In response on 19 May 2014, Stagecoach Manchester introduced route 38 from Farnworth to Rusholme via Salford and the city centre.

In September 2014, Magic Bus introduced route 141 Manchester Metropolitan University to East Didsbury. From September 2015, the service terminated in West Didsbury.

The first stage of the bus priority work was completed in June 2016.

Bus routes

Major routes

Route 41 (CrossCity)
Route 41 is operated by Go North West, branded as CrossCity, using a dedicated fleet of Mercedes Citaro buses running up to every 15 minutes, Monday to Saturday, and every 30 minutes, on Sundays, running between Middleton, North Manchester General Hospital, Manchester, Northenden and Sale. The evening 41 service is split between Stagecoach, who runs every hour between Middleton and Manchester and Go North West, who runs every hour between Sale and Manchester. The service was once served by First and Finglands, as well as Stagecoach on its X41 (Acrrington – Manchester) and 143 (West Didsbury – Manchester) services respectively.

Routes 42/42A
These services run for the entire route and beyond. Route 42 is not as frequent as similar service 142, operated by Stagecoach Manchester between Manchester and Stockport. Stagecoach services also use, along with route 43, hybrid bus vehicles, the first such on the Stagecoach Manchester fleet.

Service 42A operates from Reddish to Manchester every 30 minutes, via East Didsbury, Rusholme and to Manchester. On Sundays, it runs hourly between Reddish and East Didsbury only.

Following their purchase of Finglands, on 27 April 2014, First Greater Manchester extended some route 42 journeys to North Manchester General Hospital under the Cross Connect banner. First later closed its Rusholme depot after withdrawing its services on route 42; its South Manchester services which once operated out of the Rusholme depot are now run by Go North West.

Greater Manchester bus route 42 operates in Greater Manchester. It is operated by Stagecoach Manchester  between Manchester city centre, Manchester Royal Infirmary, Withington, Didsbury and Stockport. First Greater Manchester previously operated the route, with their buses starting at East Didsbury and running to Manchester; then extending to North Manchester General Hospital and Middleton. However, First have since withdrawn their operations on route 42, leaving only Stagecoach.

Route 42 was historically operated by Finglands Coachways and Stagecoach Manchester between Manchester Piccadilly Gardens bus station and East Didsbury. UK North also operated services in the mid-2000s. Following the sale of the Finglands business to First Greater Manchester on 9 February 2014, the new operator extended its route 42 services to become a cross city service from North Manchester General Hospital under the Cross Connect banner on 26 April 2014. This service further extended to Middleton bus station on 12 April 2015. Since 2018, First no longer operate on route 42, with Stagecoach becoming the sole operator.

Route 42 serves the busy Wilmslow Road bus corridor, which includes universities and hospitals operating via Manchester city centre, Manchester Royal Infirmary, Withington, Didsbury and Stockport.

Route 42B/42C
Route 42B operates every 60 minutes along the entire route from Manchester to East Didsbury and continues on to Woodford via Bramhall. It is operated by Stagecoach Manchester. Route 42C follows the 42B route from Manchester to East Didsbury before continuing to Handforth via Cheadle. 42B was the updated all-stop replacement for X57/145 which operated morning only Cheadle Hulme to Albert Square one-way.

Route 43
Route 43 is operated by Stagecoach Manchester, every 10 minutes. It operates from Manchester to Withington, then on to Manchester Airport via Northenden and Wythenshawe. It is the only 24-hour bus route in Greater Manchester and the only bus route the runs every day year round, even on Christmas Day and New Year. Along with Stagecoach Manchester route 42, it was the first Stagecoach routes to use hybrid buses.

Routes 142/143/147

Magic Bus operate route 142 between Manchester and East Didsbury and also its sister routes 143 between Manchester and West Didsbury and also route 147 between Piccadilly Rail Station to West Didsbury. These high-frequency services are operated by Stagecoach Manchester under the Magic Bus brand. Stagecoach use slightly older buses on these routes and ticket prices are cheaper than commercial Stagecoach services. Route 142 operates short journeys between Chorlton-on-Medlock and Withington and extra journeys at peak times to cater specifically for students. The 143 service to Sale replaced the limited stop X41 which had a much higher demand, however, the route now operates only two journeys a week during college times along this section of the route, with all other services terminating at West Didsbury

Routes V1/V2/V4
Routes V1, V2 and V4 are part of the Vantage Guided Busway network operated by First Greater Manchester. The V1 and V2 use very high spec branded buses and run from the MRI to Leigh (V1) and Atherton (V2) via Manchester Royal Infirmary, Manchester and Tyldesley. Route V4 provides peak time extras between Ellensbrook and Manchester Royal Infirmary using standard First vehicles.

Minor routes

Route 18
Route 18 is operated by Go North West runs every 15 minutes from Manchester Royal Infirmary to Manchester and continues to Langley via Collyhurst and Middleton.

Routes 23/171/172
Route 23 is operated by Stagecoach Manchester every 15 minutes, and runs from Stockport to the Trafford Centre via Didsbury, Chorlton-cum-Hardy, Stretford and Urmston. The 23 route once operated alongside sister routes 24 and 23A, which operated the same route between Stockport and Stretford but then on to MediaCity (24) and via Lostock instead of Urmston (23A) at a combined frequency of every 10 minutes, route 24 was withdrawn in 2017 due to much lower than expected patronage, most likely due to Metrolink connectivity in the areas it served, lowering the combined frequency to every 15 minutes and long running service 23A was withdrawn in April 2019 and the section in 
Lostock is now served by the 25. Routes 171 and 172 are operated by Stagecoach Manchester, running every 30 minutes to Newton Heath from Chorlton-cum-Hardy (172) and Withington Hospital (171) bus 171 goes via Gorton, Levenshulme and East Didsbury while bus 172 goes via Gorton, Levenshulme and West Didsbury.

Route 53
Route 53 is operated by Go North West every 30 minutes, and runs from Cheetham Hill to Pendleton, via Gorton, Rusholme, Old Trafford and Salford Quays.

Other routes
Several other routes operate on the route, such as school services, which are unmarked. There are also withdrawn routes 16, 23A, 24, 45, 46, 47, 48, 84, 141, 145, 157, 178, 270, 278, 370, X41 and X57. Routes that have been altered to no longer serve Wilmslow Road include services 17, 130 and 179.

Gallery

Future plans
Transport for Greater Manchester has developed bus priority measures along Wilmslow Road, in order to enable the provision of cross-city bus services. This scheme includes the section of Oxford Road in the vicinity of the university and Hospitals becoming limited to buses, cycles and hackney carriages only; it also includes a new section of bus lane in Withington and a revised layout at Parrs Wood terminus.

References

Bibliography

External links

Bus routes in Greater Manchester
Streets in Manchester
Bus transport in Greater Manchester
Bus wars